Ulrich Kiesow was one of the co-founders of Fantasy Productions (FanPro) in 1983, together with Werner Fuchs and Hans Joachim Alpers. He was the translator of the first German language editions for both Tunnels & Trolls, which was the first German language RPG rule book, and Dungeons & Dragons.
 
Most importantly, Kiesow was the creator of the pen and paper role-playing game The Dark Eye and its accompanying universe. Besides contributing to many publications regarding this game, Kiesow used the pseudonym Andreas Blumenkamp to write satirical articles for the now defunct German roleplaying game magazine Wunderwelten that was produced by FanPro.

Kiesow suffered a severe heart attack in August 1995. While recovering he began to write the Dark Eye novel Das zerbrochene Rad (The broken wheel, a symbol for death in the universe of The Dark Eye). The novel had just been completed when Kiesow died of heart failure in his home 30 on January 1997.

References

1949 births
1997 deaths
German fantasy writers
Role-playing game designers
German male writers